The Phyllobacteriaceae are a family of bacteria. The most common genus is Mesorhizobium which contains some of the rhizobia species.

Phylogeny
The currently accepted taxonomy is based on the List of Prokaryotic names with Standing in Nomenclature (LPSN). The phylogeny is based on whole-genome analysis.

Notes

References

 
Hyphomicrobiales